The World Allround Speed Skating Championships for Men took place on 25 and 26 February 1978 in Gothenburg at the Ruddalens IP ice rink.

Result

  * = Fell

Source:

Attribution
In Dutch

References 

World Allround Speed Skating Championships, 1978
1978 World Allround